Pierre du Cambout de Coislin (14 November 1636 – 5 February 1706) was a French prelate. He was a grandson of Pierre Séguier and held many important benefices - abbot of Jumièges, in 1641, of Saint-Victor, in 1643, canon of Paris, and first king's almoner in 1663. He was finally Grand Almoner of France and bishop of Orléans from 1665 to 1706, as well as (in a surprise appointment) being made cardinal priest of Trinità dei Monti.

Dangeau reported:

Saint-Simon wrote of him:

One of his successors removed the epitaph from the cardinal's tomb "since people were going there to pray to God, as at a saint's tomb". His nephew Henri Charles du Cambout de Coislin was also a bishop.

Notes

Sources
Micheline Cuénin, Un familier de Louis XIV. Le cardinal de Coislin, Grand aumônier de France, évêque d'Orléans, Orléans, 2007 (283 pages).

Pierre
1636 births
1706 deaths
Bishops of Orléans
French abbots
18th-century French cardinals